Hitesh is a common Hindu masculine given name. The name literally means "one who thinks well of everyone." or "Lord of goodness." Hitesh हितेश in Hindi means Subh Chintak सुभ चिन्तक or well wisher. The name itself suggests the meaning in Hindi, i.e., "Hit" हित means to do and thinks good for others and "esh" ईश means ishwar or God.

People named Hitesh include:
 
 
 Hitesh Basumatary, politician
 Hitesh Ceon (born 1974) – Icelandic songwriter, producer and composer
 Hitesh Hira (born 1965), Zimbabwean cricketer
 Hitesh Kadam (born 1988) – Indian cricketer
 Hitesh Kumar Bagartti – Indian politician
 Hitesh Kumari – female Indian politician
 Hitesh Modi (born 1971) – Kenyan cricketer
 Hitesh Sharma (born 1997) – Indian footballer
 Hitesh Sharma (born 1968) – retired Indian cricketer
 Hitesh Solanki (born 1991) – Indian cricketer

References

Indian masculine given names